Nishihara, Okinawa held a mayoral election on September 7, 2008. Incumbent mayor Seiyu Tarakaki, supported by Liberal Democratic Party and the New Komeito Party, was narrowly defeated by the progressive candidate Akira Uema, supported by all centre, centre-left and left parties.

Results

Sources 
 Results from JanJan 
 Akahata english edition coverage

2008 elections in Japan
Mayoral elections in Japan
September 2008 events in Japan